Open turn may refer to:
Open turn (swimming), a turn technique in swimming
Open Turn (politics) 
Open turn (dance), a dance move